"Dame Otro Tequila" is a song written by Emilio Estefan, Ricardo Gaitán, Alberto Gaitán, Tony Mardoni and Tom Mcwilliams for Rubio's seventh album Pau-Latina (2004). It was produced by Emilio Estefan, co-produced by Gaitan Bros and Tony Mardini and released as the album's third single in North America and Latin America (see 2004 in music).

Formats and track listing
These are the formats and track listings of major single releases of "Dame Otro Tequila".
Mexico CD promo
"Dame Otro Tequila - Album Version"
"Dame Otro Tequila - Quirri Mix"
"Dame Otro Tequila - Dance Remix"
"Dame Otro Tequila - Reggaeton" (feat. Baby Rasta)
"Dame Otro Tequila - Banda Urbana Version"

Music video
The video was released in the MTV VMALA's 2004, in the red carpet.

Chart performance
The song was a success peaking at number one on the Hot Latin Songs as well as the Latin Pop Airplay. It is the album's third consecutive top ten single as well as the second number one from Pau-Latina. The song managed to peak at #105 on the U.S. Also, it was number one Billboard Biz (.biz) charts, such as Top Internet and Top Reggae charts; as well the music video was number one on VHS Sales, Video Rentals and Game Rentals charts.

Charts

References

2004 singles
Paulina Rubio songs
Spanish-language songs
Songs written by Emilio Estefan
Song recordings produced by Emilio Estefan
2004 songs
Universal Records singles
Songs written by Ricardo Gaitan
Songs written by Alberto Gaitan